Ricardian may refer to:

 A follower of Ricardian economics, named after economist David Ricardo (1772–1823)
 Ricardian (Richard III), a defender of the reputation of King Richard III of England